The International Jewish Sports Hall of Fame was opened July 7, 1981 in Netanya, Israel. It honors Jewish athletes and their accomplishments from anywhere around the world.

It is located at the Wingate Institute for Physical Education and Sport. It has inducted over 400 athletes and sportspersons representing 40 countries. The Hall elects new honorees each year, with submissions due December 1 for votes for the following year, and a formal induction ceremony taking place several days prior to the Maccabiah Games every four years.

The Hall was founded by Joseph M. Siegman, a television producer and writer who lives in Beverly Hills, California. He chaired the Hall from 1981 to 1989, and later served as chairman of its Selection Committee.

The IJSHOF is separate from the National Jewish Sports Hall of Fame, an American hall of fame that honors only American Jews.

Inductees
NB — * denotes a posthumous induction

Pillar of Achievement
The Pillar of Achievement recognizes Jewish men and women who have made significant contributions to sports and to the world community through sports.

Lifetime Achievement
In 1992, the International Jewish Sports Hall of Fame initiated its Lifetime Achievement Award which has been awarded annually honoring those individuals who have made significant contributions to the State of Israel and society through sports.

Chairman's Award of Excellence

See also
List of Jews in sports
Jewish Sports Review
National Jewish Museum Sports Hall of Fame (U.S.)
Southern California Jewish Sports Hall of Fame

Notes and references

Books
 Jews and Baseball: The Post-Greenberg Years, 1949–2008, Burton Alan Boxerman, Benita W. Boxerman, McFarland, 2010, 
 The Baseball Talmud: The Definitive Position-by-Position Ranking of Baseball's Chosen Players, Howard Megdal, Collins, 2009, 
 Jews and the Sporting Life, Vol. 23 of Studies in Contemporary Jewry, Ezra Mendelsohn, Oxford University Press US, 2009, 
 Day by Day in Jewish Sports History, Bob Wechsler, KTAV Publishing House, 2008, 
 The Big Book of Jewish Athletes: Two Centuries of Jews in Sports – a Visual History, Peter S. Horvitz, Joachim Horvitz, S P I Books, 2007, 
 The Big Book of Jewish Sports Heroes: An Illustrated Compendium of Sports History and The 150 Greatest Jewish Sports Stars, Peter S. Horvitz, SP Books, 2007, 
 Jews, Sports, and the Rites of Citizenship, Jack Kugelmass, University of Illinois Press, 2007, 
 The New Big Book of Jewish Baseball: An Illustrated Encyclopedia & Anecdotal History, Peter S. Horvitz, Joachim Horvitz, Perseus Distribution Services, 2007, 
 Jews and Baseball: Entering the American mainstream, 1871–1948, Burton Alan Boxerman, Benita W. Boxerman, McFarland, 2006, 
 Emancipation through Muscles: Jews and Sports in Europe, Michael Brenner, Gideon Reuveni, translated by Brenner, Reuveni, U of Nebraska Press, 2006, 
 Jewish Sports Stars: Athletic Heroes Past and Present, David J. Goldman, Edition 2, Kar-Ben Publishing, 2006, 
 Judaism's Encounter with American Sports, Jeffrey S. Gurock, Indiana University Press, 2005, 
 Jews and the Olympic Games; Sport: Springboard for Minorities, Paul Yogi Mayer, Vallentine Mitchell, 2004, 
 Great Jews in Sports, Robert Slater, Jonathan David Publishers, 2004, 
 Jews and the Olympic Games: The Clash between Sport and Politics: with a complete review of Jewish Olympic medallists, Paul Taylor, Sussex Academic Press, 2004, 
 The 100 Greatest Jews in Sports: Ranked According to Achievement, B. P. Robert Stephen Silverman, Scarecrow Press, 2003, 
   Foiled, Hitler's Jewish Olympian: the Helene Mayer Story,  Milly Mogulof, RDR Books, 2002, 
 The Big Book of Jewish Baseball: An Illustrated Encyclopedia & Anecdotal History, Peter S. Horvitz, Joachim Horvitz, SP Books, 2001, 
 Jewish Sports Legends: the International Jewish Hall of Fame, 3rd Ed, Joseph Siegman, Brassey's, 2000, 
 Sports and the American Jew, Steven A. Riess, Syracuse University Press, 1998, 
 When Boxing was a Jewish Sport, Allen Bodner, Praeger, 1997, 
 Ellis Island to Ebbets Field: Sport and the American Jewish Experience, Peter Levine, Oxford University Press US, 1993, 
 The Jewish Child's Book of Sports Heroes, Robert Slater, Jonathan David Publishers, 1993, 
 The International Jewish Sports Hall of Fame, Joseph M. Siegman, SP Books, 1992, 
 The Jewish Athletes Hall of Fame, B. P. Robert Stephen Silverman, Shapolsky Publishers, 1989, 
 The Jewish Boxers Hall of Fame, Ken Blady, SP Books, 1988, 
 The Great Jewish Chess Champions, Harold U. Ribalow, Meir Z. Ribalow, Hippocrene Books, 1987, 
 The Jewish Baseball Hall of Fame: a Who's Who of Baseball Stars, Erwin Lynn, Shapolsky Publishers, 1986, 
 From the Ghetto to the Games: Jewish Athletes in Hungary, Andrew Handler, East European Monographs, 1985, 
 The Jew in American Sports, Harold Uriel Ribalow, Meir Z. Ribalow, Edition 4, Hippocrene Books, 1985, 
 Jewish Baseball Stars, Harold Uriel Ribalow, Meir Z. Ribalow, Hippocrene Books, 1984, 
 The Jewish Athlete: A Nostalgic View, Leible Hershfield, s.n., 1980
 Encyclopedia of Jews in Sports, Bernard Postal, Jesse Silver, Roy Silver, Bloch Pub. Co., 1965

External links
IJSHoF official website
"Int'l Jewish Sports Hall of Fame announces class of 2007," The Jerusalem Post, December 1, 2006

Jewish sports organizations
Lists of Jews
Museums in Central District (Israel)
Sport in Israel
Jewish
Israeli sports trophies and awards
Organizations based in Netanya
Awards established in 1981
Sport in Netanya

Halls of fame in Israel
1981 establishments in Israel